The Weeki Wachee River is a river in Hernando County, Florida, United States. It flows  westwards from Weeki Wachee to the Gulf of Mexico at the Weeki Wachee estuary. The name is derived from the Seminole: uekiwv /oykéywa, wi:-/ "spring" and -uce /-oci/ "small", signifying either a small spring or an offshoot of a town named Spring. The river is best known for its spring, and the Weeki Wachee Springs attraction built on the premises. The spring is the surfacing point of an underground river, which is the deepest naturally occurring spring in the United States. The water temperature is a steady  year-round.

References 

 Jack B. Martin, Margaret McKane Mauldin: A Dictionary of Creek/Muskogee: With Notes on the Florida and Oklahoma Seminole Dialects of Creek, University of Nebraska Press (2000).  
 The Miami Herald: "For the mermaids, it's where the show springs eternal", by Jodi Mailander Farrell, 6 August 2006. (via Activa)

Bodies of water of Hernando County, Florida
Rivers of Florida
Outstanding Florida Waters